Emerging Adulthood is the second studio album by Dan Croll. It was released on 21 July 2017 by Communion Music.

Critical reception 

At Metacritic, which assigns an average rating from mainstream critics, the album received a score of 57 out of 100, based on four reviews, which indicates "mixed or average reviews". Writing for The Independent, the journalist Andy Gill gave the album two out of five stars, writing, "Dan Croll's follow-up to Sweet Disarray suffers from a kind of creeping anonymity: immediately after hearing it, it's virtually impossible to recollect the salient features of any track." In a more positive review, Clash journalist Lois Browne wrote, "Though Emerging Adulthood does push Croll far out of his personal comfort zone to a certain extent, it does feel like he could go further with the complexity. Nevertheless, his musicianship is undeniable, as each and every instrument on the record is played by himself. It's a vital sign that Croll's only just coming truly into his own."

Track listing

References 

2017 albums
Dan Croll albums
Indie rock albums by British artists